Serena Williams was the defending champion but did not compete that year.

Kim Clijsters won in the final 6–2, 6–1 against Mary Pierce.

Seeds
A champion seed is indicated in bold text while text in italics indicates the round in which that seed was eliminated. The top four seeds received a bye to the second round.

  Kim Clijsters (champion)
  Elena Dementieva (quarterfinals)
  Patty Schnyder (second round)
  Jelena Dokić (second round)
  Francesca Schiavone (quarterfinals)
  Anna Smashnova-Pistolesi (first round)
  Silvia Farina Elia (quarterfinals)
  Magüi Serna (second round)

Draw

Final

Section 1

Section 2

External links
 2004 Open Gaz de France Draw

Singles
Open Gaz de France